South Regional TAFE is a State Training Provider providing a range of vocational education located in southern regional Western Australia. On 11 April 2016, South West Institute of Technology, Great Southern Institute of Technology, the CY O’Connor Institute Narrogin campus and the Goldfields Institute of Technology Esperance campus formed South Regional TAFE.

Campuses and facilities
The college currently trains around 6,000 students each year and operates at 12 campuses in southern Western Australia:

 Albany
 Bunbury
 Busselton
 Collie
 Denmark
 Esperance
 Harvey
 Katanning
 Margaret River
 Manjimup
 Mount Barker
 Narrogin

Courses
South Regional TAFE offer courses in areas including:

 Adult Learning & Bridging Courses
 Agriculture & Environment
 Arts & Design
 Automotive & Engineering
 Building & Construction Trades
 Business & Administration
 Design & Drafting
 Hair & Beauty
 Health & Community Services
 Hospitality & Tourism
 Information Technology
 Mining, Resources and Science
 Retail
 Sports & Recreation
 Surveying
 Training & Education
 Work Health, Safety and Cleaning

South Regional TAFE courses are in line with the Australian Qualifications Framework (AQF). The AQF establishes standard titles and levels for courses across Australia. The qualifications currently offered include:

 Advanced Diploma
 Diploma
 Certificate IV
 Certificate III
 Certificate II
 Certificate I

References

External links
 South Regional TAFE
 TAFE International Western Australia
 Training.gov.au

TAFE WA